Emran Ali Sarkar is a Bangladesh Nationalist Party politician and the former Member of Parliament of Rajshahi-11.

Career
Sarkar was elected to parliament from Rajshahi-11 as a Bangladesh Nationalist Party candidate in 1979.

Death
Sarkar died on 12 December 2007.

References

Bangladesh Nationalist Party politicians
2007 deaths
2nd Jatiya Sangsad members